Gretta Cohn is a cellist who is best known for playing cello in the rock group Cursive from 2001-2005. She left the group in August 2005. Her departure was announced on the Cursive website in late August:
Cursive regrets to announce the departure of cellist Gretta Cohn. After four years in the band, Gretta has decided to leave Omaha to pursue other interests and projects, including a potential solo album. The split is very amicable: the band wishes her well and she in turn eagerly anticipates the new Cursive material to come. Cursive will not be seeking a replacement.

She has collaborated with other artists including the band Twin Thousands. She appeared on 2006's Halloween episode of Late Night with Conan O'Brien, performing with Cat Power.

She currently resides in New York City where she is the founder and principal of Transmitter Media. In July 2022, Transmitter Media agreed to be acquired by Pushkin Industries. Cohn is now the Senior Vice President of Content Production at Pushkin Industries.

Cohn was previously Executive Producer of Show Development for the podcast company Midroll Media, and a producer for the podcast Freakonomics Radio  as well as the public radio show Soundcheck.

Album appearances

With Cursive
Burst and Bloom (2001, Saddle Creek)
8 Teeth to Eat You (2002, Better Looking Records)
The Ugly Organ (2003, Saddle Creek)

Other
The Faint - Danse Macabre (2001 · Saddle Creek Records)
The Good Life - Black Out (2002 · Saddle Creek Records)
Mayday - Old Blood (2002 · Saddle Creek Records)
Bright Eyes - Lifted or The Story Is in the Soil, Keep Your Ear to the Ground (2002 · Saddle Creek Records)
Rilo Kiley - The Execution of All Things (2002 · Saddle Creek Records)
Head of Femur - Ringodom or Proctor (2003 · Greyday Productions)
Thursday - War All the Time (2003 · Island Records)
Bright Eyes/Neva Dinova - One Jug of Wine, Two Vessels (2004 · Crank!)
Tilly and the Wall - Wild Like Children (2004 · Team Love Records)
Criteria - Prevent the World single (2005 · Saddle Creek Records)
Maria Taylor - 11:11 (2005 · Saddle Creek Records)
Bright Eyes - Noise Floor (Rarities: 1998-2005) (2006 · Saddle Creek Records)
The Guatemalan Handshake - Film Soundtrack
Twin Thousands - Summer EP (2007, self-released)
Twin Thousands - Like You A Lot - Single (2007 · Exercise1 Records)

Trivia
She plays a Yamaha SVC-100 electric cello.

References

External links
Official Cursive website
Saddle Creek Records
Gretta Cohn website

Year of birth missing (living people)
Living people
American rock cellists
Cursive (band) members